Sha'ab Yafa'a is a sub-district located in Ibb District, Ibb Governorate, Yemen. Sha'ab Yafa'a had a population of  18383 as of 2004.

References 

Sub-districts in Ibb District